Taesŏngsan is a mountain in Taesong-guyok, Pyongyang, North Korea. One popular visitor attraction on Taesŏngsan is the outdoor ice rink. Others include the Revolutionary Martyrs' Cemetery and the Korea Central Zoo.

In 2022, an ice cream manufacturing facility opened at the foot of Taesŏngsan under Kim Jong Un's order.

See also
List of mountains of Korea

References

Geography of Pyongyang
Mountains of North Korea